Lawrence Smith (July 1878 – September 1912) was an English footballer. His regular position was as a forward. He was born in Manchester. He played for Army Football, New Brompton, and Manchester United.

External links
MUFCInfo.com profile

1878 births
1912 deaths
English footballers
Manchester United F.C. players
Gillingham F.C. players
Footballers from Manchester
Association football forwards